Oreana is a village in Macon County, Illinois, United States, which had a population of 891 at the 2020 census. It is included in the Decatur, Illinois Metropolitan Statistical Area.

Geography
Oreana is located in northeastern Macon County at  (39.937964, -88.869322). Illinois Route 48 passes through the village, leading southwest  to Decatur, the county seat, and northeast  to Argenta.

Demographics

As of the census of 2000, there were 892 people, 343 households, and 267 families residing in the village. The racial makeup of the village was 98.99% White, 0.11% Asian, 0.11% from other races, and 0.78% from two or more races. Hispanic or Latino of any race were 0.45% of the population.

There were 343 households, out of which 33.2% had children under the age of 18 living with them, 68.2% were married couples living together, 6.7% had a female householder with no husband present, and 21.9% were non-families. 20.1% of all households were made up of individuals, and 7.3% had someone living alone who was 65 years of age or older. The average household size was 2.60 and the average family size was 3.00.

In the village, the population was spread out, with 25.6% under the age of 18, 7.4% from 18 to 24, 29.3% from 25 to 44, 26.1% from 45 to 64, and 11.7% who were 65 years of age or older. The median age was 39 years. For every 100 females, there were 104.6 males. For every 100 females age 18 and over, there were 97.0 males.

The median income for a household in the village was $51,339, and the median income for a family was $58,229. Males had a median income of $45,000 versus $21,118 for females. The per capita income for the village was $20,133. About 1.4% of families and 2.8% of the population were below the poverty line, including 2.0% of those under age 18 and 1.8% of those age 65 or over.

References

External links

Villages in Macon County, Illinois
Villages in Illinois